Universidade Aberta (UAb) is a public distance education university in Portugal. Established in 1988, UAb offers higher education (undergraduate, master and doctorate degrees) and Lifelong Learning study programs. All programs are taught in e-learning mode since 2008, the year that UAb became a European institution of reference in the area of advanced e-learning and online learning through the recognition of its exclusive Virtual Pedagogical Model.

It was the first university in Portugal to introduce a women's studies program. The master's degree of Women's Studies – Gender, Citizenship and Development was launched in 1995 under the direction of Teresa Joaquim and expanded into a PhD program as well in 2002.

See also
List of universities in Portugal
Higher education in Portugal

References

External links
 

Ab
Educational institutions established in 1988
Education in Lisbon
1988 establishments in Portugal
Distance education institutions
Educational organisations based in Portugal